The Molecule of the Month (MOTM) is a website launched in 1996 by Henry Rzepa of the Imperial College London, Karl Harrison of the University of Oxford, and Paul May of the University of Bristol. Each month since January 1996, a new molecule has been added to the list on the page, making it one of the longest-running chemistry websites on the internet.

External links 
 The Molecule of the Month
 Molecule of the week

References 

1996 establishments in England
British science websites
Internet properties established in 1996
Science websites